Alexander Warjri was an Indian politician. He was a Member of Parliament, representing Meghalaya in the Rajya Sabha the upper house of India's Parliament as an Independent.

References

Rajya Sabha members from Meghalaya
1929 births
2010 deaths
Independent politicians in India